Arundhati is an Indian given name. Notable people with the name include:

Arundhati Ghose (born 1940), Indian diplomat
Arundhati Ghosh (born 1960), cricketer 
Arundhati Kirkire (born 1980), cricketer
Arundhati Nag (born 1956), polyglot actress
Arundhati Pantawane (born 1989), Indian Badminton Player
Arundhati Roy (born 1961), writer
Arundhati Reddy, cricketer
Arundhati Virmani (born 1957), historian and academic

Indian feminine given names